was a Japanese film director. He directed 13 films between 1980 and 2000.

Career and style
His film Moving was screened in the Un Certain Regard section at the 1993 Cannes Film Festival. His 1998 film, Wait and See, won the FIPRESCI prize at the 49th Berlin International Film Festival in 1999.

The Edinburgh International Film Festival artistic director Chris Fujiwara noted that American film director Nicholas Ray and French film director Jean Vigo shared Somai's sensibilities.

Filmography

 Tonda Couple (1980)
 Sailor Suit and Machine Gun (1981)
 P.P. Rider (1983)
 The Catch (1983)
 Love Hotel (1985)
 Typhoon Club (1985)
 Lost Chapter of Snow: Passion (1985)
 Luminous Woman (1987)
 Tokyo Heaven (1990)
 Moving (1993)
 The Friends (1994)
 Wait and See (1998)
 Kaza-hana (2000)

Further reading

References

External links

1948 births
2001 deaths
Japanese film directors
Deaths from lung cancer in Japan
People from Morioka, Iwate
People from Isehara, Kanagawa